Bert C. Daikeler (February 23, 1928 – January 7, 2012) was a Republican member of the Pennsylvania House of Representatives.

References

1928 births
2012 deaths
Republican Party members of the Pennsylvania House of Representatives